Morphetts Flat is a locality on the right bank of the Murray River downstream of Morgan in South Australia. It lies on low flat land along the inside of a long right-hand bend in the river. The locality is dominated by shack sites and houseboats. It includes a slipway used for servicing and maintenance of houseboats. Evidence that the locality is used for holiday accommodation is shown in the  when there were only 3 residents (all female) but 31 private dwellings recorded.

References

Towns in South Australia